Elizabeth Wyckes, (also Wykys, or Wykes) (d. 1529) was the wife of Thomas Cromwell (1485 – 28 July 1540), Earl of Essex, and chief minister to Henry VIII of England. She was daughter to Henry Wyckes, a well-to-do clothier from Chertsey, and his wife Mercy, who married Sir John Pryor after Wyckes' death.

Marriages and issue
Elizabeth married as her first husband Thomas Williams, a Yeoman of the Guard. There were no known children from this union.

Around 1515, Elizabeth remarried, this time to Thomas Cromwell, who had recently returned to England from Antwerp. Together, Thomas and Elizabeth had three surviving children: 
 Gregory Cromwell, 1st Baron Cromwell, c. 1520 – 4 July 1551  
 Anne Cromwell
 Grace Cromwell

Little is known about Elizabeth Wyckes, or her marriage to Thomas Cromwell; she died early in his career, long before he reached his zenith. During the early years of their marriage, Thomas Cromwell had been a successful merchant and lawyer and there is evidence to suggest that he had taken over the running of Henry Wyckes' business. The home where Elizabeth lived with her husband and mother, and where her children were born, appears to have been both harmonious and prosperous. Cromwell could afford to buy expensive jewellery: "a sapphire ring" and "a gold bracelet with a jacinth worth £80."  His friends were merchants and scholars and he and his wife regularly entertained them and corresponded with them. Elizabeth and her mother played their part in this circle of friends. One wrote asking for the good housewife "to send another plaster for his knee" and another desired to be commended "to your mother, after you my most singular good friend."  The one surviving letter from Thomas to his wife suggests a normal, happy marriage. He also sent her a doe that he had downed while hunting.

Elizabeth Wykes was the daughter of Henry Wykes of Putney, Surrey, a shearman who later became a gentleman usher to Henry VIII. She and her husband Thomas Cromwell lived in Austin Friars, London. Before her death in Stepney, her husband had attracted the attention of Cardinal Wolsey and was rapidly making a name for himself in court circles. After her death, her mother, by then Mrs. Pryor, lived in Cromwell's house with her second husband for several more years.

Descendants 
Elizabeth died early in 1529, of what is believed to be the sweating sickness, and was survived by her three children, her husband, and her mother. Her daughters, Anne and Grace, are believed to have died not long after their mother of the same disease. Thomas Cromwell never remarried. Gregory Cromwell married Elizabeth Seymour, the sister of Queen Jane Seymour and widow of Sir Anthony Ughtred. They had five children:
 Henry Cromwell, 2nd Baron Cromwell, 1538 – 1592
 Edward, 1539 – died young
 Thomas Cromwell, c. 1540 – died between February 1610 and April 1611
 Katherine (or Catherine) Cromwell, c. 1541 –
 Frances Cromwell, c. 1544 – 7 February 1562

Fictional portrayals
Natasha Little portrayed Elizabeth Wyckes (called Liz Cromwell in the credits) in Wolf Hall, six-part TV series first broadcast by BBC Two in early 2015.

Footnotes

Sources

 

 
 
 
 
 
 
 
 

1529 deaths
15th-century English women
16th-century English women
15th-century English people
Elizabeth